Ali Hajizade is a Middle East analyst and entrepreneur.

Early life and education 
Ali Hajizade was born on February 26, 1984, in Baku, Azerbaijan. He graduated from the Azerbaijan State Academy of Fine Arts with a degree in History of Art.

Career 

As a Middle East analyst, Hajizade contributed to and was cited in a number of Western, as well as Turkish, Israeli media outlets and publications. Hajizade's publications on malicious information activity were referred to by other researchers.

Since 2012, Hajizade has headed the "Hajizade Group", which operates in the fields of public relations, education and media.

In 2015, Ali Hajizade launched "The Greater Middle East" project, dedicated to the research and analysis of the Greater Middle East region. A number of
prominent experts contributed to the project. Hajizade left the project in late 2021.

The main focus of Hajizade as a Middle East analyst are the study and analysis of tactics of hybrid wars, information wars and disinformation campaigns.

In 2018–2019, Hajizade was a columnist for Al Arabiya English.

In early 2022, Hajizade founded a US based startup dealing with human-focused information security.

References 

Living people
1984 births
Azerbaijani political scientists
Political scientists
Columnists
Azerbaijani columnists
Al Arabiya